Narayani Sena, Narayana Gopas, Gopayan or Yadava Sena, the army of Lord Krishna of Dwarka Kingdom is called as the supreme Sena of all time. It is described in the Mahabharata as being all of the Abhira (Ahir) caste. They were the basic threat to the rival kingdoms. Fearing Narayani Sena, many Kings didn't try fighting against Dwaraka. Because Dwaraka sorted most of the threats through Krishna's politics and talent of Yadavas. Using Narayani Sena, the Yadavas extended their empire to most of India.

Composition of Narayani Sena
The Sena includes Krishna’s 18,000 brothers and cousins. The Sena had 7 Maharathis
(Krishna, Balaram, Samba, Ahuka, Charudeshna, Chakradeva and Satyaki) and  7 Athirathis
(Kritavarma, Anadhrishti, Samika, Samitinjaya, Kanka, Sanku, Kunti).

Involvement in Kurukshetra war
Before the war started in the Kurukshetra battlefield in Mahabharat (one of the two major epics of ancient India), both sides – the Kauravas and the Pandavas started out in all directions to meet various kings to solicit support. Incidentally, both Duryodhana (from Kauravas side) and Arjuna (from Pandavas side) reached Dwarika, the kingdom of Shree Krishna together.
Lord Krishna put forward a condition in front of both – you can have either me on your side or my entire army, the Yadav army – known as the Narayani Sena. He also told both that he wouldn't take to any arms or weapon during the entire war. So when Krishna first asked Arjun what he wanted, much to Duryodhana's delight, he opted for the Lord- 'Narayan' and Duryodhana got these great warriors of the strong army-'the Narayani Sena.  When Narayani Sena was fighting for Kauravas, only Kritavarma and his army unit fought for the Kauravas. Satyaki fought for the Pandavas. The rest of the Atirathis and Maharathis were withheld from the Kurukshetra war on the advice of Balram and Krishna.

Post-war attack on Arjuna
These Gopas, whom Krishna had offered to Duryodhana to fight in his support when he himself joined Arjuna's side, were no other than the Yadavas themselves, who were also the Abhiras. They were the supporters of the Duryodhana and Kauravas, and in the Mahabharata, Abhir, Gopa, Gopal and Yadavas are all synonyms. They defeated the hero of Mahabharatha war (Arjuna), and spared him when he disclosed the identity of the members of the family of Sri Krishna.

See also
Abhira
Yadava

Reference

Kurukshetra
Mahabharata
Kurukshetra War
War in mythology
Puranic chronology
Ahir